Sergiopol is a rural locality (a village) and the administrative centre of Sergiopolsky Selsoviet, Davlekanovsky District, Bashkortostan, Russia. The population was 362 as of 2010. There are 6 streets.

Geography 
Sergiopol is located 6 km west of Davlekanovo (the district's administrative centre) by road. Doroshevka is the nearest rural locality.

References 

Rural localities in Davlekanovsky District